Dudley Stewart Hamilton 'Dud' Millard (1901-1954) was an Australian premiership winning rugby league footballer who played in the 1920s.

Background
Millard was born at Taree, New South Wales to parents Alfred and Mary Millard in 1901.

Playing career
The family moved to Balmain and Millard came through the junior ranks to be graded with the Balmain club in 1920. Millard played five seasons of first grade league with Balmain between 1922 and 1926, and played centre in the side that won the 1924 Grand Final defeating South Sydney 3–0.  As of the 2019 NRL season, this is the lowest score in a grand final. 

His only representative appearances came in 1924 and 1925, when he was selected to play three games for New South Wales and once in 1925 for Metropolis.

Death
Millard died on 5 October 1954, aged 53, late of Five Dock, New South Wales.

References

1901 births
1954 deaths
Balmain Tigers players
New South Wales rugby league team players
Australian rugby league players
Rugby league wingers
Rugby league centres
Rugby league players from Taree